Wake Up and Dream is a 1934 American musical film directed by Kurt Neumann, written by John Meehan Jr., and starring Russ Columbo, Roger Pryor, June Knight, Catherine Doucet, Henry Armetta and Andy Devine. It was released on October 1, 1934, by Universal Pictures.

Plot

Cast 
Russ Columbo as Paul Scotti
Roger Pryor as Charlie Sullivan
June Knight as Toby Brown
Catherine Doucet as Madame Rose
Henry Armetta as Giovanni Cellini
Andy Devine as Joe Egbert aka Egghead
Spencer Charters as Earl Craft
Wini Shaw as Mae LaRue
Gavin Gordon as Seabrook
Richard Carle as Roger Babcock
Paul Porcasi as Polopolis
Maurice Black as Tom Romero
Clarence Wilson as Hildebrand
Arthur Hoyt as George Spelvin
Philip Dakin as John Richards
Jane Darwell as Landlady

References

External links 
 
 

1934 films
American musical films
1934 musical films
Universal Pictures films
Films directed by Kurt Neumann
American black-and-white films
Films produced by B. F. Zeidman
1930s English-language films
1930s American films